Jannaro "Jan" Uvena (born August 29, 1950) is an American musician, best known for playing drums with a number of notable rock bands, including Alice Cooper's backing band, Iron Butterfly, Alcatrazz, and Signal.

Uvena retired from the music business in 2000 and, as of 2016, manages a U.S. Cellular store in Walpole, Massachusetts.

Discography

with Bonnie Pointer
Bonnie Pointer (1979)

with Pipedream
Pipedream (1979)

with Alice Cooper
Zipper Catches Skin (1982)

with Alcatrazz
No Parole from Rock 'n' Roll (1983)
Live Sentence (1984)
Metallic Live '84 VHS (1984)
Disturbing the Peace (1985)
Power Live '85 VHS (1985)
Dangerous Games (1986)
Live '83 (2010)
Live In Japan 1984 Complete Edition (2018)

with Signal
Loud & Clear (1989)
Live (2000)

with Jonas Hansson Band
No. 1 (1994)
Second To None (1996)
The Rocks (1999)

References 

1950 births
Living people
Musicians from New York (state)
American heavy metal drummers
Alice Cooper (band) members
Iron Butterfly members
20th-century American drummers
21st-century American drummers
American male drummers
Alcatrazz members